The Vocal Group Hall of Fame & Museum Company Inc. was an American-based hall of fame that honored vocal groups throughout America. 
James E. Winner Jr. was the financial and managing partner of the For-profit corporation known as "The Vocal Group Hall of Fame & Museum Company Inc." James E. Winner Jr. and Anthony F. Butala shared The Museum Company as corporate officers/stockholders and set up an office located at Mr. James E. Winner's business address on State Street in Sharon PA. 16146. 
 
The Vocal Group Hall of Fame was conceived by Anthony F. Butala who came up with the idea of the museum/hall of fame and James E. Winner Jr. a successful local Sharon businessman and entrepreneur who agreed to fund and operate the project. Tony Butala, the man with the plan, is also the founding member of the famous 50s & '60s singing group The Lettermen.
 
Tony is the only living original member of The Lettermen. Although Mr. Butala is no longer performing with his singing group, the group continues to carry the "Legacy of The Lettermen" with Donovan Tea, the longest-living evolved member of almost 40 years with Tony Butala an original member of over 60 years as the longest-living original member as the founder - Tony Butala of The Lettermen.  Bobby Poynton joined the group two separate times for a total of about 20 years and Rob Gulack the newest member of The Lettermen replaced Tony Butala.
 
"The Vocal Group Hall of Fame & Museum Company Inc." opened in 1998 followed by The Vocal Group Hall of Fame 501 (c)3 Non-Profit Foundation. The foundation was formed and operated by attorneys and accountants employed by James E. Winner Jr. 

The foundation was created to care for, protect, and display the Inductees' memorabilia and to enjoy the benefits of a non-profit foundation. The foundation began collecting donations of memorabilia from the inductees and began seeking grants from the city of Sharon, the Commonwealth of Pennsylvania, and solicited donations from a hopeful supportive public.
 
Shortly after Mr. Winners'renovated his Museum building and he opened the Museum and set up headquarters at the newly renovated museum building that he owned across the street from his offices on State Street in Sharon, PA 16146.

Inductions were scheduled and promoted for 9/11/2001. The Vocal Group Hall of Fame Inductions and were to be produced behind the museum building in Sharon, PA. parking lot. The Vocal Group Hall of Fame Museum Company Inc. had begun the 2001 Inductions preparation, production, and promotion when the tragic news of the 911 terror attack crisis that left artists/inductees unable to travel to Inductions, all planes grounded, caused the canceled and postponed 2001 Inductions. The 2001 Inductions were postponed to October 4, 2001. 

After, 9/11 and prior to October 4, 2001, a few members of the Vocal Group Hall of Fame museum staff went to a concert at a nearby Cleveland Indians minor league baseball stadium in Ohio and saw Cool & The Gang, Village People, and Disco Explosion, liked the production, show management and made an offer to the concert producer "Bob Crosby" who got his start in the entertainment business at Dick Clark Productions in 1976 and currently has almost a 50-year career as a music television producer contracted to produce the 2001 Vocal Group Hall of Fame Production. Mr. Crosby accepted the offer and successfully staged the concert, recorded video and audio of the 2001 Inductions, and marketed and packaged the first DVD of Inductions.  

Prior Quarters and annual projections showed low attendance to the museum and unsatisfying ticket sales to both the museum and Inductions. This caused tensions between Mr. Winner & Mr. Butala who was less helpful than intended because he was on tour most of the time with The Lettermen. This issue continued and culminated in the resolution of all matters by dissolving the interest and partnership in the For-profit Vocal Group Hall of Fame and Museum Company Inc. 

MR. Butala wanted his dream to continue and suggested to MR. Winner, to have Mr. Crosby take over the Vocal Group Hall of Fame Foundation and rent the museum building from Mr. Winner. Mr. Butala and Mr. Winner follow through with the closing of the Vocal Group Museum Company Inc. as Mr. Crosby took over operations of The Vocal Group Hall of Fame Foundation as President and CEO and was provided all legal documents, keys, and authority to lead the Foundation. 

Soon after Mr. Crosby took over the operation and administration of the Foundation with full access to the Vocal Group museum, Mr. Winner's attorneys and accountants (the board of directors of the foundation) resigned once Mr. Crosby became the President / CEO of the Vocal Group Hall of Fame Foundation as James E. Winner Jr and Anthony F. Butala closed the For-profit Vocal Group Hall of Fame & Museum Company Inc. 

Within a couple of months of Mr. Crosby's appointment as President / CEO of the foundation expecting a reasonable rental price such as the prior rate of $1 a year rent plus utilities and maintenance of the building. However, the rent had increased to $12,000 per month. Other bills and debts not agreed to become the foundation's responsibility instead of The Museum Company's responsibility. Then, when all museum renovation bills were demanded by Mr. Winner to become Foundation Bills depriving the foundations of any chance to survive with debt suggested in excess of $1,000,000.00. A final settlement was accepted after lawsuits were filed, and there is no longer any financial obligation due to Mr. Winner by the foundation.

As differences grew, it became clear to the Vocal Group Hall of Fame Foundation that the Foundation could no longer afford to rent or occupy Mr. Winners Museum building. The Foundation became unable to provide for the museum and the foundation's past bills and was left with no alternative other than to NOT renew the offered lease and find a new location.

June 14, 2002, The Vocal Group Hall of Fame Foundation purchased the 1750-seat 1922 Columbia Theatre, an early Warner Brothers Theatre, and moved all the foundation's memorability to safe clean climate controlled storage and ended our lease in Mr. Winners museum building as a tenant. The Foundation office relocated to the Columbia Theatre in Sharon, Pennsylvania. – and the For-profit Vocal Group Hall of Fame Museum Company Inc. was closed.

The Vocal Group Hall of Fame Foundation typically inducts sixteen Vocal Groups annually and has been delayed lacking the funding in Sharon, PA. Artists are inducted within categories, with each category having an Original group member, evolved group member, or a family member as an inductee representative. These categories include 1940s, 1950s, 1960s, 1970s, 1980s, and duos. The Vocal Group Hall of Fame Foundation releases a public ballot, allowing everyone to vote for both the nominees and the inductees and expanding around the world in every genre of music.

While only vocal groups having three-part harmony are eligible, other categories such as duos and Lead solo vocalists with a harmony group may be inducted if they have a legitimate backup harmony group with backing harmony singers (for example, Tom Petty and the Heartbreakers).

The Vocal Group Hall of Fame public operations including the theater and museum have been closed and on hiatus since 2008 due to the lack of financial support in the area but continue its mission to establish and operate a Museum Attraction where the inductees meet and perform in support of their foundation.  

On June 14, 2001, the Vocal Group Hall of Fame Foundation purchased the 1750-seat Columbia Theatre in Sharon, PA, "with the promise of grant funding to follow. The Commonwealth did have a multi-million dollar grant if we could meet the match.  As of today over twenty years later, the Foundation is yet to achieve opening the attraction or receive adequate funding in Sharon, PA. Much is still needed to renovate, open, and operated the foundation's attraction, and become capable to raise funds on its own through benefit concerts at The Columbia Theatre. Meanwhile, the restoration of the theatre has stalled due to the lack of funding, a part of a new roof was installed and the plastered maintained of the dome was completed and made a watertight shell. 

A Pennsylvania correction facility was the first serious improvement organized by The Vocal Group Non-profit to The Columbia Theatre and was achieved during the first few years of the purchase of the theatre. More than 100 tons of debris was removed by a Pennsylvania correction facility made ready for renovation with the help of Senator Bob Robbins before his retirement.

In November 2004, the museum moved out of James Winner's 3-story museum building and relocated to the Columbia Theatre with all of the Foundations memorabilia moved to clean temperature-controlled storage waiting for its new home for display. The new location at Columbia Theatre was meant to serve both as The Vocal Group Hall of Fame Foundation's central office and as the location for the annual induction ceremony and benefit concerts to support the foundation and theatre at the Sharon PA attraction. The museum was intended to move to a three-story restaurant building purchased by the foundation located next to, and adjacent to the theater, with the restaurant portion becoming a vocal group-themed museum, bar and grill, nightclub piano bar next to The Columbia Theatre, where Inductees were to perform benefit concerts for their foundation. 

Jon Bauman, actively Chairmen of The Truth In Music Committee along with Frank Maffei had help from Joe Terry of Danny & The Juniors, Maxine Pinkney of Bill Pinkney, The Original Drifters, Veta & Carl Gardner of The Coasters, Herb Reed and Sonny Turner of The Platters and others. Jon Bauman, Mary Wilson, with Bob Crosby at the Foundation office was able to assist other artists in this effort to protect the Artist from fraudulent abuse. Mary Wilson championed the Truth in Music bill for many years throughout the United States. Further, with the help of The Recording Academy, added Hawaii to The list of states with the Truth In Music Bill  Truth In Music Bill as the 35th state to pass The Truth In Music Bill also known as the Truth in Advertising Act, and was one of the best supporters of The Vocal Group Hall of Fame Foundation as Chair of the Artist Advisory Board and continued her support up until her passing a few years ago. The Truth In Music Bill, which has since been adopted by most U.S. states, was created to protect artists from identity theft, or ensuring people performing in a group using the name must actually perform on one of the albums or has legal use of the name. The main beneficiaries are the surviving members of the Platters, The Coasters, The Drifters, and the Marvelettes, iconic groups victimized by Larry Marshak and other promoters of impostor groups.

The VGHF has been on hiatus since 2008. The operating organization's plans to open in Los Angeles, CA. and were once again delayed during the Covid-19 pandemic.The Vocal Group Hall of Fame would consider a partner purchasing 50% ownership of The Columbia Theatre and would entertain the full sale of the Columbia Theatre.

Vocal Group Hall of Fame Inductees

1998–2002

1998
The Ames Brothers
The Andrews Sisters
The Beach Boys
The Boswell Sisters
Crosby, Stills & Nash
Clyde McPhatter & The (Original) Drifters
The Five Blind Boys of Mississippi
The Golden Gate Quartet
The Manhattan Transfer
The Mills Brothers
The Platters
The Ravens
Sonny Til & The Orioles
The Supremes

1999
The Coasters
The Delta Rhythm Boys
The Four Seasons
The Four Tops
Hank Ballard & The Midnighters
The Ink Spots
The Jackson Five
Little Anthony & The Imperials
The Modernaires
The Moonglows
Peter, Paul and Mary
The Revelers
The Spinners
The Temptations

2000
The Bangles
Ben E. King and The Drifters
Dion and The Belmonts
Dixie Hummingbirds
The Flamingos
Frankie Lymon & The Teenagers
The Kingston Trio
The Mamas & The Papas
The Skylarks
The Soul Stirrers
Three Dog Night

2001
Bee Gees
The Chordettes
Eagles
The Four Aces
The Four Freshmen
Gladys Knight and The Pips
The Lennon Sisters
The Lettermen
The McGuire Sisters
Michigan Jake
The Oak Ridge Boys
The Pied Pipers
Smokey Robinson and The Miracles
The Vogues
The Weavers

2002
ABBA
The Chantels
The Clovers
The 5th Dimension
The Five Keys
The Four Knights
The Harptones
Jay and The Americans
The Marcels
The Shirelles
The Skyliners
The Swan Silvertones

2003–2007

2003
The Association
The Charioteers
The Commodores
Danny & The Juniors
Earth, Wind & Fire
The Five Satins
The Four Lads
The Impressions
The Isley Brothers
Martha & The Vandellas
The Merry Macs
Peerless Quartet
The Whispers

2004
Alabama
American Quartet
The Beatles
The Cadillacs
The Crests
The Dells
The Diamonds
The Doobie Brothers
The Everly Brothers
The Four Tunes
The Jordanaires
The Marvelettes
The O'Jays
The Penguins
The Ronettes
The Stylistics
The Tokens

2005
The Angels
The Brooklyn Bridge
The Chi-Lites
The Chiffons
The Crystals
The Del-Vikings
The Hilltoppers
The Mel-Tones
The Neville Brothers
The Pointer Sisters
The Rascals
The Righteous Brothers
Sons of the Pioneers
The Spaniels
The Tymes

2006
America
Billy Ward & The Dominoes
Bread
The Byrds
Deep River Boys
The Duprees
The Fleetwoods
Haydn Quartet
The Hi-Lo's
The Hollies
Journey
The Lovin' Spoonful
The Moody Blues
Queen
The Shangri-Las
Simon & Garfunkel

2007
The Capris (1960s)
The Chords (1950s)
The Dixie Cups (1960s)
The Five Red Caps (1940s)
The Four Preps (1950s)
Maurice Williams and the Zodiacs; The Gladiolas (1950s)
Harold Melvin & The Blue Notes (1970s)
The Hoboken Four (Pioneer Award)
The Jive Five (1960s)
Kool & The Gang (1970s)
The Monkees (1960s)
Ruby & The Romantics (1960s)
Sam & Dave (Duo Award)
Sly & The Family Stone (1960s)
Tony Orlando and Dawn (1970s)
The Traveling Wilburys (1980s)

See also
 List of music museums
 List of vocal groups

References

Music halls of fame
Halls of fame in Pennsylvania
Awards established in 1998
Museums in Mercer County, Pennsylvania
Music museums in Pennsylvania
1998 establishments in the United States
Vocal ensembles
Sharon, Pennsylvania